Jhargram Assembly constituency is an assembly constituency in Jhargram district in the Indian state of West Bengal.

Overview
As per orders of the Delimitation Commission, No. 222 Jhargram Assembly constituency is composed of the following: Jhargram municipality, Bandhgora, Manikpara, Radhanagar and Sapdhara gram panchayats of Jhargram community development block and Binpur I community development block.

Jhargram Assembly constituency is part of No. 33 Jhargram (Lok Sabha constituency) (ST).

Election results

2021

2016

2011

.# Swing calculated on Congress+Trinamool Congress vote percentages taken together in 2006.

1977-2006
In the 2006 state assembly elections, Amar Basu of CPI(M) won the Jhargram assembly seat defeating his nearest rival Shivendra Bijoy Malladeb of Congress. Contests in most years were multi cornered but only winners and runners are being mentioned. Mina Sanatani of CPI(M) defeated Makhan Lal Bangal of Trinamool Congress in 2001. Buddhadeb Bhakat of CPI(M) defeated Chaitanya Murmu of Congress in 1996 and Nikhil Maiti of Congress in 1991. Abani Bhusan Satpathi of CPI(M) defeated Bhabesh Mahata of Congress in 1987 and Birendra Bijoy Malladeb of Congress in 1982. Ram Chandra Satpathy of CPI(M) defeated Birendra Bijoy Malladeb of Congress in 1977.

1957-1972
Birendra Bijoy Malladeb of Congress won in 1972 and 1971. Panchkari De of Bangla Congress won in 1969. P.C.Ghosh, Independent, won in 1967. Mahendra Nath Mahata of Congress won in 1962 and 1957.

References

Assembly constituencies of West Bengal
Politics of Jhargram district